"John" is a song by American rapper Lil Wayne, and the second single from his album Tha Carter IV. The song features rapper Rick Ross, and it peaked at number 22 on the Billboard Hot 100. "John" was released on March 24, 2011, on iTunes. The song uses the hook from Rick Ross' song "I'm Not a Star" from his album Teflon Don. The song title is a reference to English musician John Lennon. Lil Wayne performed the song at 2011's MTV Video Music Awards to the riff of Black Sabbath song, Iron Man.

Music video
The music video was released on VEVO on May 12, 2011. Birdman makes an appearance in the video, which was directed by Colin Tilley, who directed Chris Brown's "Look at Me Now," which also featured Wayne.

Remixes
On May 11, rapper Ace Hood released a freestyle over the beat of "John," which was off his "Body Bag Vol. 1" mixtape. Another rapper Wiz Khalifa released a remix to "John" titled "Chuck". Rapper Chamillionaire freestyled a verse along with the original lyrics on his Badass Freemixes 2 mixtape. On December 26, Lil Wyte also released his own version on his Wyte Christmas mixtape. Tyga also released a version of the track titled "Well Done 2" on a mixtape along with the same name. Jim Jones also released a freestyle.

Track listing

Charts and certifications

Weekly charts

Year-end charts

Certifications

References

2011 singles
Lil Wayne songs
Rick Ross songs
Songs written by Lil Wayne
Cash Money Records singles
Music videos directed by Colin Tilley
Songs written by Rick Ross
Songs written by Hitmaka
Songs written by Erik Ortiz
Songs written by Kevin Crowe
Songs written by Ayo the Producer